Marah horridus, common name Sierra manroot, is a species of flowering plant in the family Cucurbitaceae, endemic to the foothills of the Sierra Nevada and the Tehachapi Mountains in California. It grows in open and shrubby areas below  elevation.

Description

Marah horridus is a perennial vine growing from a large, branched tuber. It produces a climbing stem with tendrils and many lobed, rounded leaves. The flowers are white.

References

Cucurbitoideae
Endemic flora of California
Flora of the Sierra Nevada (United States)
Flora without expected TNC conservation status